Acer hyrcanum is a maple species sometimes referred to as Balkan maple. It grows in southeastern Europe and western Asia.

Acer hyrcanum is a deciduous tree up to 15 meters (50 feet) tall. Leaves are up to 4 cm (1.6 inches) across, usually 5-lobed but occasionally with only 3 lobes, dark green on top, lighter green underneath because of a layer of wax.

Subspecies
Acer hyrcanum subsp. hyrcanum - Armenia; Azerbaijan, Turkey, Iran
Acer hyrcanum subsp. intermedium (Pančić) Palam. - Albania; Bulgaria; Former Yugoslavia; Greece
Acer hyrcanum subsp. keckianum (Asch. & Sint. ex Pax) Yalt. - Turkey 
Acer hyrcanum subsp. reginae-amaliae (Orph. ex Boiss.) E.Murray - Greece
Acer hyrcanum subsp. sphaerocaryum Yalt. - Turkey 
Acer hyrcanum subsp. stevenii (Pojark.) E.Murray - Crimea
Acer hyrcanum subsp. tauricolum (Boiss. & Balansa) Yalt. - Lebanon; Syria; Turkey

References

External links
Henriette Kress, Henriette's Herbal Homepage: Acer hyrcanum — includes photos of the leaves of each of the subspecies.

hyrcanum
Flora of Europe
Flora of Western Asia
Trees of Europe
Trees of Western Asia
Plants described in 1838
Taxa named by Carl Anton von Meyer
Taxa named by Friedrich Ernst Ludwig von Fischer